Markeyvius LaShun Cathey (born August 3, 1997), better known by his stage name Key Glock, is an American rapper and songwriter from Memphis, Tennessee. A protégé of Young Dolph, he rose to fame in 2017 with his mixtape Glock Season. He is signed to Young Dolph's record label Paper Route Empire.

Early life
Markeyvius LaShun Cathey was born in South Memphis on August 3, 1997. When he was 20 months old, his mother was sent to prison, where she would be for the next 15 years, in both state and federal facilities. His father was in and out of his life, so he was raised by his grandmother and his aunt. According to Cathey, he and his grandmother occasionally visited his mother in prison during his youth. At 18 years old, he was charged with three counts of aggravated assault related to his involvement in a shooting. Music was a distraction from his oftentimes tumultuous life.

Cathey said he grew up listening to Gucci Mane,  Lil Wayne, and cites Three 6 Mafia as his largest influence. He was also a big fan of Project Pat, whom he describes as the "Drake of Memphis". According to Glock, Pat's songs "If You Ain't From My Hood" and "Gorilla Pimp" changed his life. The latter's chorus inspired one of his breakout songs, "Dig That". The first track that Glock recorded himself was a freestyle of Future's "Ain't No Way Around It" in 2011.

Career
Young Dolph signed Key Glock to the Paper Route Empire label in 2017. On January 25 of that year, Glock released his debut single "Racks Today" featuring American rapper Jay Fizzle. On June 16, 2017, Glock released his debut mixtape, Glock Season, under the label. His collaborative album Dum and Dummer with Young Dolph reached number eight on the Billboard 200. Young Dolph's "Major" featuring Key Glock reached number 47 on the Hot R&B/Hip-Hop Songs chart.

Following the release of his collaborative album Dum and Dummer with Young Dolph, he went on a European tour across Manchester and London. The pair brought out UK rapper Blade Brown as a supporting act. The two proceeded to start the "No Rules" Tour in 2020, beginning on February 5 in Seattle.

On January 31, Key Glock released his debut studio album titled Yellow Tape, which debuted at number 14 on the Billboard 200. On May 22, 2020, Key Glock released his sixth mixtape, Son of a Gun, again with no features.

On March 5, 2021, Key Glock and Young Dolph released the single, "Aspen", and announced the release of their second collaborative album, Dum and Dummer 2, due for release on March 26, 2021. It is a sequel to 2019's Dum and Dummer. The project's cartoon artwork references Beavis & Butthead.

On January 18, 2022, Key Glock released the song "Proud", a tribute to Young Dolph. It is included on the Dolph tribute compilation Long Live Young Dolph, released January 21, 2022.

On February 24, 2023, Key Glock released his third studio album, Glockoma 2. It is the sequel to his 2018 mixtape Glockoma.

Personal life
Key Glock is the cousin by marriage of Young Dolph, who was murdered in November 2021. Following Dolph's death, in a since-deleted Instagram post, Key Glock called him "my lefthand man, my brother, my cousin, and my mentor.”  The same month Young Dolph died he got a tattoo of Young Dolph.

In May 2019, Key Glock was arrested for possession of a firearm and over 20 grams of marijuana.

Discography

Studio albums

Compilation albums

EPs

Mixtapes

Singles

As lead artist

As featured artist

Other charted and certified songs

Notes

References

1997 births
African-American male rappers
Rappers from Memphis, Tennessee
Living people
21st-century African-American people
21st-century American rappers
Trap musicians
Gangsta rappers
Southern hip hop musicians